Johann Christophe Andreas Mayer (December 8, 1747 – November 1801) was a German anatomist. 

Mayer worked in Berlin and later Frankfurt. In 1788, he was the first European to recognize that fingerprints were unique to each individual.

Notes

1747 births
1801 deaths
German anatomists
Fingerprints
Scientists from Berlin